John M. Slattery Jr. (born August 13, 1962) is an American actor and director widely known for his role as Roger Sterling Jr. in the AMC drama series Mad Men (2007–15), for which he was nominated four times for the Primetime Emmy Award for Outstanding Supporting Actor in a Drama Series. 

Slattery's other acting credits include a starring role as Ben Bradlee, Jr., in the Best Picture-winning film Spotlight (2015), and the role of Howard Stark in the Marvel Cinematic Universe films Iron Man 2 (2010), Ant-Man (2015), Captain America: Civil War (2016), and Avengers: Endgame (2019). He won two Critics' Choice Television Awards for Mad Men and was part of the Mad Men ensemble cast that won two Screen Actors Guild Awards.

In 2013, Slattery directed his first feature film, God's Pocket (2014), which he co-wrote with Alex Metcalf. The film, based on a 1983 novel of the same name by Pete Dexter, premiered at the 2014 Sundance Film Festival and was picked up for distribution by IFC Films.

Early life
Slattery was born in Boston, Massachusetts, to Joan (née Mulhern), a retired accountant, and John "Jack" Slattery, a leather merchant. He is one of six children. As a young boy, he dreamed of being a baseball player.

Slattery is of Irish descent and was raised Catholic. He attended high school at Saint Sebastian's School in Newton, Massachusetts (since relocated to Needham, Massachusetts), and received a Bachelor of Fine Arts from The Catholic University of America in 1984.

Career
Apart from his role on Mad Men, Slattery has had roles such as union organizer Al Kahn on Homefront; Senator Walter Mondale in the HBO miniseries From the Earth to the Moon; as political adviser Tommy Flannigan in the HBO series K Street; guest appearances as Will Truman's brother Sam on Will & Grace; as Michael Cassidy, Amy's estranged husband, on Judging Amy; politician Bill Kelley on Sex and the City; principal Dennis Martino on Ed; and college president Peter Benedict on Jack and Bobby. In March 2007, he began a series of appearances on Desperate Housewives portraying Victor Lang, Gabrielle Solis's (Eva Longoria) second husband, until his character's death in Season 4. In December 2009, Slattery appeared on The Colbert Report in a faux commercial advertising gold.

Slattery played Paul Moore, boyfriend of Katherine Watson (portrayed by Julia Roberts) in the film Mona Lisa Smile, and he portrayed Howie in David Lindsay-Abaire's play, Rabbit Hole. He had a small part as a teacher in the film Sleepers. He also appeared as a government promoter in the Clint Eastwood feature Flags of our Fathers and as CIA official Henry Cravely in Charlie Wilson's War. He was cast as Bert Miller, father of the leading female character, in Dirty Dancing: Havana Nights, and in The Adjustment Bureau played Richardson, a mid-level agent in the mysterious paranormal agency called the Bureau. Slattery narrates the audiobook versions of Don DeLillo's 2007 novel Falling Man, Stephen King's 2008 psychological horror novel Duma Key, and Ernest Hemingway's 1929 novel A Farewell to Arms.

In 2015, Slattery portrayed journalist Ben Bradlee Jr. in the Academy Award-winning, Golden Globe-nominated drama film Spotlight, and also appeared in the Netflix comedy series Wet Hot American Summer: First Day of Camp, for which he earned a nomination for the Critics' Choice Television Award for Best Guest Performer in a Comedy Series.

Personal life
Slattery married actress Talia Balsam in 1998 (who also played his on-screen wife, Mona, in Mad Men); they have one son together.  They live in SoHo, Manhattan.

Filmography

Film

Television

Theater

Video game

Music videos

As director

Awards and nominations

References

External links

 
 
 

1962 births
20th-century American male actors
21st-century American male actors
Male actors from Boston
American male film actors
American people of Irish descent
American male stage actors
American male television actors
American Roman Catholics
Catholic University of America alumni
Living people
American television directors
Writers from Boston
Outstanding Performance by a Cast in a Motion Picture Screen Actors Guild Award winners
People from SoHo, Manhattan